Parqu (Quechua parquy irrigation Hispanicized spelling Parjo) is a mountain west of the Paryaqaqa or Waruchiri mountain range in the Andes of Peru, about  high. It is situated in the Lima Region, Huarochirí Province, Quinti District. Parqu lies between the Qarwapampa valley in the west and the Mankaqutu valley in the east, west of the lake named Suyuqqucha.

References

Mountains of Peru
Mountains of Lima Region